Ugochukwu "Ugo" Ihemelu  (born 3 April 1983 in Enugu) is a retired Nigerian-born American football player.

Career

College
Ihemelu grew up in the United States, attended Cedar Hill High School in Cedar Hill, Texas (a suburb of Dallas), and played college soccer at Southern Methodist University, where he was named All-Missouri Valley Conference his junior and senior seasons.

During his collegiate off-season, Ihemelu played with the Texas-based USASA team Legends FC, who he helped qualify for the Lamar Hunt U.S. Open Cup in 2004.

Professional
The Los Angeles Galaxy drafted him with the fifth overall pick of the 2005 MLS SuperDraft. He helped the Galaxy to the US Open Cup and MLS Cup double in his rookie season. After his second season in LA, on 1 December 2006, Ihemelu was traded to the Colorado Rapids. After 3 years with Colorado, Ihemelu was traded to FC Dallas in exchange for Drew Moor, a 2010 MLS SuperDraft pick, and allocation money.

Ihemelu was named to the MLS Team of the Week in weeks 8 and 11 in the 2011 MLS season for his play against D.C. United, Seattle Sounders, and Houston Dynamo.
On 30 June 2011, he signed a contract extension with FC Dallas through the 2015 MLS season. Prior to the 2012 MLS season, Ihemelu was named FC Dallas captain. During the 2012 season, he suffered a concussion that eventually led to his retirement.

International
Ihemelu made his debut for the United States on 29 January 2006, against Norway.

Unusually, he was then called up by Canada in June 2008 and traveled with the team for their match against St. Vincent and the Grenadines. While the Canadian Soccer Association has Ihemelu's hometown listed as Winnipeg, Manitoba, Ihemelu's eligibility to play for Canada was in doubt, due to his appearing for the United States in the aforementioned Norway game, and to questions over his Canadian citizenship. For these reasons, the Canadians did not field Ihemelu in the Saint Vincent game.

In January 2009 Ihemelu was called into the US's training camp. He joined San Jose (MLS) defender Jason Hernandez as replacements for Clarence Goodson and Cory Gibbs who left camp early. He then appeared in the match following the camp against Sweden, clearing a guaranteed goal off the line.

Honours

Los Angeles Galaxy
Lamar Hunt U.S. Open Cup (1): 2005
Major League Soccer MLS Cup (1): 2005
Major League Soccer Western Conference Championship (1): 2005

FC Dallas
Major League Soccer Western Conference Championship (1): 2010

See also
Ugochukwu
History of Nigerian Americans in Dallas–Fort Worth

References

External links

Ihemelu interview with Soccer365

 (archive)

1983 births
Living people
American soccer players
LA Galaxy players
Colorado Rapids players
FC Dallas players
Nigerian emigrants to the United States
Nigerian footballers
United States men's international soccer players
SMU Mustangs men's soccer players
African-American soccer players
Footballers from Enugu
Major League Soccer players
LA Galaxy draft picks
All-American men's college soccer players
Association football defenders
21st-century African-American sportspeople
20th-century African-American people